The Beijing Concert Hall (北京音乐厅; Beijing Yinyueting) is located on the Beixinhuajie in Xicheng District, near the west Chang'an Avenue, on the south of Liubukou.

References

External links
北京音乐厅 Beijing Concert Hall (official site)

Concert halls in China
Performing arts venues in Beijing